Nov Dojran is a village in the southeastern part of North Macedonia. It is part of the municipality of Dojran. Nov Dojran means "New Dojran" in Macedonian.

It is located on the banks of Doiran Lake, near the Greek border.

Demographics
According to the 2002 census, the settlement had a total of 1100 inhabitants. Ethnic groups in the village include:
Macedonians 1023
Serbs 27
Turks 23
Romani 14
Albanians 11
Bosniaks 1
Others 1

Sports
The local football club FK Dojransko Ezero plays in the Macedonian Third Football League.

References

Villages in Dojran Municipality